Leslie Dam is a dam in the locality of the same name Leslie Dam, Southern Downs Region, Queensland, Australia. Freshwater fishing and water sports facilities are available.

The dam was named after Patrick Leslie (1815–1881), an early settler in the region and the first person to buy land in Warwick.

SunWater is undertaking a dam spillway capacity upgrade program to ensure a consistently high level of safety for the dams under their control, including the Leslie. The spillway will be upgraded in the longer term.

History
The dam was extended in 1986, increasing capacity by 100%. The dam's highest level was reached on 12 September 1988 when waters in the dam peaked at 20 cm above the spillway. The next highest level was 13 cm above the spillway on the 28 May 1990. On 11 February 1995, the dam reached its lowest level ever of 3% capacity.

On the night of 5 January 2011, the dam spilled for the first time in more than two decades. All seven floodgates were opened. The resulting high waters in Sandy Creek closed the Cunningham Highway. The following day SunWater reduced the release rate after requests by Warwick's mayor.

Fishing
A Stocked Impoundment Permit is required to fish in the dam.

See also

List of dams and reservoirs in Australia

Gallery

References

External links 
Pictures - National Library of Australia

Reservoirs in Queensland
Southern Downs Region
Dams in Queensland
Dams in the Murray River basin